The Turkish Men's Volleyball Championship was a top-level volleyball league competition in Turkish volleyball, run by the Turkish Volleyball Federation from 1948 to 1970.

Champions

Performance by club

References
 Atabeyoğlu, Cem. 1453-1991 Türk Spor Tarihi Ansiklopedisi. page(559).(1991) An Grafik Basın Sanayi ve Ticaret AŞ
 Somalı, Vala, "Türk-Dünya Voleybol Tarihi 1896-1986", İstanbul (1986).
 Bengü, Mehmet, "Voleybol", İstanbul (1987).
 Milliyet Newspaper Archives

Mens
Turkey
Defunct sports competitions in Turkey
1948 establishments in Turkey
1970 disestablishments in Turkey
Men's sport in Turkey